The Trinidad International  was a men's and women's international tennis tournament founded in 1964 and played on outdoor clay courts or sometimes hard courts at the Tranquility Square Lawn Tennis Club in Port of Spain, Trinidad and Tobago. The tournament was only held until 1966 as part of the Caribbean Circuit.

History
The Trinidad International was a mens international tennis tournament founded in 1965 and played on outdoor hard courts at the Tranquility Square Lawn Tennis in Port of Spain, Trinidad and Tobago. The tournament was held until 1966 when it was discontinued.

Finals

Men's Singles
:Included.

Women's Singles

References

Clay court tennis tournaments
Hard court tennis tournaments
Defunct tennis tournaments in Trinidad and Tobago